Triteleia dudleyi is a species of flowering plant known by the common name Dudley's triteleia. It is endemic to California, where it is known from sections of the High Sierra Nevada and the Transverse Ranges. It is a plant of subalpine climates, growing in mountain forests. It is a perennial herb growing from a corm. It produces two or three basal leaves up to 30 centimeters long by one wide. The inflorescence arises on an erect stem up to 30 or 35 centimeters tall and bears an umbel-like cluster of many flowers. Each flower is a funnel-shaped yellow bloom that dries purple. The flower has six lobes measuring up to 1.2 centimeters long. There are six stamens with lavender anthers.

References

External links
Jepson Manual Treatment
Flora of North America
Photo gallery

dudleyi
Endemic flora of California
Flora of the Sierra Nevada (United States)
Natural history of the Transverse Ranges
Flora without expected TNC conservation status